The Treasurer of Arkansas acts as the head banker for the State of Arkansas, handling deposits, withdrawals, redemptions of state warrants, and investments of state funds. The position was created in 1819 when Arkansas became a territory. When Arkansas became a state in 1836, its constitution established the Office of the Treasurer, a position that would be elected by the legislature.

The current Arkansas State Treasurer is Mark Lowery.

List of treasurers

Territorial treasurers

State treasurers

External links
 Official Arkansas State Treasurer web site

References

1836 establishments in Arkansas